Lawrence O'Neill may refer to:

 Lawrence Joseph O'Neill (born 1952), United States federal judge
 Lawrence O'Neil (born 1954), Canadian former Member of Parliament and current federal judge

See also 
 Laurence O'Neill (1874–1943), Irish politician, Lord Mayor of Dublin 1917–1924